Dabiq may refer to:

 Dabiq, Syria, a town in northern Syria
 Battle of Marj Dabiq, between the Ottoman Empire and the Mamluk Sultanate in 1516
 Battle of Dabiq, of 2015, on the List of wars and battles involving ISIL
 2016 Dabiq offensive, a military offensive and part of the third phase of Operation Euphrates Shield with the goal of capturing the town of Dabiq
 Dabiq (magazine), the online magazine used by the Islamic State of Iraq and the Levant